Straffan was a station located 2½ miles (3.5 km) from Straffan in County Kildare, Ireland. It also served the village of Ardclough.

History
Straffan Station was on the Great Southern & Western Railway's main Dublin to Cork line, and had opened two years after the line itself in August 1848. Five years later, the third worst rail accident in Irish history occurred a quarter of a mile south of Straffan, when a goods train ran into the back of a stationary passenger train, causing eighteen deaths.

A post office was built near the station in May 1872.

The station, which had up and down platforms, with a small station building on the up side, was closed by CIÉ in November 1947, but it remained a signalling block post. The signal cabin at Straffan was closed however in 1976, after which the redundant station buildings became derelict and were demolished in the mid 1980s.

References

External links
 Photographs
  MGWR Railway History

Disused railway stations in County Kildare
Railway stations opened in 1848
1848 establishments in Ireland
Railway stations closed in 1947
1947 disestablishments in Ireland

Railway stations in the Republic of Ireland opened in 1848